The  logothetēs tou praitōriou was a senior official, one of the two principal aides (together with the symponos) of the Eparch of Constantinople, the capital of the Byzantine Empire. Literary and sigillographic evidence attests to the existence of this office from the late 7th or early 8th century up to the 11th century. His exact role is unclear, but, since the praitōrion was one of the capital's chief prisons, his functions were probably judicial and police-related.

References

Sources

Further reading

Administration of Constantinople
Pritorion